"" ("Victory") is the national anthem of the partially recognized state of Abkhazia. It was adopted in 1992. The lyrics were written by poet Gennady Alamia, and the music was composed by Valery Chkadua.

History
The lyrics were written after Abkhazia's proclamation of independence in 1992. They used as inspiration the Abkhazian revolutionary song "Kiaraz" that originated during the short-lived Democratic Republic of Georgia (1918–1921).

In 1994, after the war for independence with Georgia, Valery Chkadua composed the anthem at the personal request of the first Abkhazian President Vladislav Ardzinba. Chkadua, who studied under Sergei Prokofiev and Dmitry Shostakovich, included various folk motives in the anthem. Chkadua, who refused royalties for the work, had written the anthem in the winter in a freezing, unheated house, but received housing as a thank you from the president.

The anthem was officially adopted by the People's Assembly on 24 October 2007 in the constitutional law of the Republic of Abkhazia "On the State Anthem of the Republic of Abkhazia", No. 1873-s-IV, signed by President Sergei Bagapsh on 2 November 2007.

Lyrics

Abkhaz original

In Russian

See also
National Anthem of South Ossetia
List of national anthems

Notes

References

External links
National Anthem of Abkhazia - The website "Abkhazia, Land of the Seven Stars" has a page on the anthem that features both a vocal and an instrumental version.

National anthems of the Commonwealth of Unrecognized States
1992 compositions
Abkhazia
National symbols of Abkhazia
Abkhazia